This is a list of protocol stack architectures. A protocol stack is a suite of complementary communications protocols in a computer network or a computer bus system.

See also
 Lists of network protocols
 IEEE 802

Network protocols
Communications protocols
Network protocol stacks
stacks